Notable present and past Lehigh University faculty include:

Ferdinand P. Beer
Michael Behe
Donald T. Campbell
Huai-Dong Cao
Fazıl Erdoğan - Member of the National Academy of Engineering 
Maurice Ewing
Dan M. Frangopol
Lawrence H. Gipson
Joseph I. Goldstein
John Grogan
John E. Hare
 Joachim Grenestedt
Terry Hart
Daniel Chonghan Hong
Thomas Hyclak
George Rankine Irwin
Stanley J. Jaworski
Derrick Henry Lehmer
Alexander Macfarlane
Gordon Moskowitz
Ronald Rivlin
 Rajan Menon
Dork Sahagian- Nobel Laureate
Greg Strobel
André Weil
Ricardo Viera
Stephanie Powell Watts
George D. Watkins, member of the National Academy of Sciences
Albert Wilansky, discoverer of the mathematical property of Smith numbers through his brother-in-law Harold Smith's phone number, 493-7775

 
Lehigh University faculty